Gaston Hardy (April 22, 1917 – July 15, 1977) was a municipal and provincial politician in Shawinigan Falls, Quebec. He was the 13th Mayor of the City of Shawinigan Falls, from 1954 to 1957.

Biography 

Gaston Hardy was born in 1917 in Portneuf, Quebec. He completed commercial scientific studies in 1934 in Trois-Rivières. In 1942, he settled in Shawinigan Falls, where he worked for the Aluminium Company of Canada (Alcan). He later worked as insurance agent. He once lived at 1512, rue Saint-Joseph, in the Saint-Marc neighborhood.

In the July 5, 1954 general municipal election, Hardy ran for mayor of Shawinigan Falls and won the election over the other candidate, Paul-Émile Bélanger, a businessman. He was sworn into office on July 12, 1954. During Hardy's term, the City created a city planning department and appointed a full-time city planner. On January 7, 1957 mayor Hardy's proposal to annex to the City the three neighbouring municipalities of Shawinigan-Sud, Shawinigan-Est and Baie-Shawinigan was defeated by a majority of the City council members. On January 14, 1957 Hardy announced his resignation as mayor for reasons of health problems, on the advice of his doctors. A by-election was called for February 11, 1957 to elect a new mayor for the remaining 10 months of the term. The two candidates were businessman J.-Armand Foucher and alderman Fernand Bilodeau. Foucher won.

Hardy was the Union Nationale candidate in the district of Saint-Maurice in the 1956 and the 1960 Quebec general elections.  Each time he lost against incumbent MLA René Hamel.

He died in 1977 in Shawinigan.

Rue Hardy in the Shawinigan-Nord neighbourhood was named to honour him.

Notes and references

1917 births
1977 deaths
Mayors of Shawinigan
Union Nationale (Quebec) politicians